Ephedra cutleri, the Navajo ephedra or  Cutler's jointfir, is a species of Ephedra that is native to the Southwestern United States (Arizona, New Mexico, Utah, Colorado, Nevada, Wyoming).

Description 
It grows on flat and dry sandy areas, and occasionally on rocky slopes. Anchored by the rhizomes and an advantageous root system, Ephedra cutleri leaves grow in an opposite orientation but can not sustain all growth. Because the leaves are too small to perform photosynthesis, it is conducted in the sticky stems of the plant.

Cultivation 
In one study, E. cutleri was the major plant found in Northeastern Arizona where dry, loamy, fine sand surfaced layers of Sheppard series soils dominate and form coppice dunes due their strong rhizomes.

Stabilized dunes are preferred at higher elevations.

Evapotranspiration of waste water studies have been performed where E. cutleri is the predominant established plant species.  Their adaptation to the arid conditions of the desert landscape provide ideal functionality of evaporating the deposited water.

Uses 
A food source for animals, there are differing views as to whether the plant has any medicinal properties for humans with the exception of brewing Mormon tea.  Another source indicated the stems contain ephedrine which can be used to treat respiratory symptoms.

Taxonomy 
The plant was originally described by Robert Hibbs Peebles in 1940. It was placed in section Ephedra sect. Asarca.

The formation of the mountains and arid climatic variation conditions of the Southwestern United States and provides and ideal environment for the Ephedra species to develop.  E. cutleri has diverged along with other variants such as E. californica and E. viridis during the Late Miocene and Pliocene epochs from one of the original Ephedra species E. distachya.

Distribution 
USA (AZ, CO, NM, UT, WY)

Dispersal method is normally small mammals.

Wetland Indicator 
Not determined

References

External links
Al Schneider - http://www.swcoloradowildflowers.com .

NatureServe Explorer - http://explorer.natureserve.org/index.htm

Integrated Taxonomic Information System - https://www.itis.gov/

USDA Natural resources Conservation Service - https://plants.usda.gov/core/profile?symbol=EPCU

cutleri
North American desert flora
Flora of the Southwestern United States
Plants described in 1940